Oscar Charles Badger II (June 26, 1890 – November 30, 1958) was an admiral of the United States Navy who served in both World Wars, and, as a junior officer, received the Medal of Honor.

Early life and family
The grandson of Commodore Oscar C. Badger (1823–1899), son of Admiral Charles J. Badger (1853–1932) and a cousin of Secretary of the Navy George E. Badger (1795–1866), Oscar Badger II was born June 26, 1890, in Washington, D.C. He graduated from the United States Naval Academy in 1911.

Naval career

Veracruz Occupation
Several thousand American troops landed, in an effort to force out General Victoriano Huerta, who had seized power in Mexico. Fifty-five men were awarded the Medal of Honor for this action, including seven leaders of the battleship's 'bluejacket battalion'. Badger was cited, "For distinguished conduct in battle, engagements of Vera Cruz, 21 and April 22, 1914. Ens. Badger was in both days' fighting at the head of his company, and was eminent and conspicuous in his conduct, leading his men with skill and courage."

World War I and interwar service
Badger served with the destroyer force in European waters during World War I. He commanded the destroyer from August to October 1918.  Badger received the Navy Cross for distinguished service as her commanding officer.

Following the war, he served as gunnery officer on various ships.  He was then assigned to duty with the Bureau of Ordnance.

World War II

In February 1944, he became Commander Service Squadrons South Pacific and in October Commander of Battleship Division 7. Badger was the first Navy officer to step ashore in Japan at the end of World War II.

Admiral Badger received four awards of the Legion of Merit (two with the Combat "V" device) for service during World War II.

Postwar service
On January 19, 1948, Badger was promoted to vice admiral and, the following month, became Commander, Naval Forces, Far East. In that post, he observed the gradual loss of the Chinese mainland to Communist forces and supervised the retirement of American forces to port cities on the China coast.  Following his service as commander of Western Pacific naval forces, Badger was appointed as Commander, Naval Forces, Western Pacific, later commanding the Eleventh Naval District, and the Eastern Sea Frontier.

On June 19, 1951, during congressional hearings on the loss of China, Vice-Admiral Badger testified that the U.S. arms embargo against Nationalist China led to a loss of capability and morale that resulted in their defeat by Communist Chinese forces led by Mao Tse-tung.

He retired from the U.S. Navy in June 1952 with the rank of full admiral.

Badger was a consultant with Sperry Corporation.

Badger was the commander of Civil Defense from 1952 to 1953.

Admiral Badger died on November 30, 1958 and was buried at Arlington National Cemetery, in Arlington, Virginia.

Legacy
Officially,  was named in honor of all the members of the Badger family who served in the U.S. Navy, but when she was launched in 1968, her sponsor, Isabelle Austen Badger, Adm. Badger's widow, said "I christen thee Oscar Charles Badger II!".

Awards

Medal of Honor citation
Admiral Badger received the Medal of Honor for actions in the Veracruz Occupation December 4, 1915 as an Ensign.
The medal was Accredited to: District of Columbia. G.O. No.: 177.

Citation:
For distinguished conduct in battle, engagements of Vera Cruz, 21 and 22 April 1914. Ens. Badger was in both days' fighting at the head of his company, and was eminent and conspicuous in his conduct, leading his men with skill and courage.

Navy Cross citation
Navy Cross awarded for actions during World War I

Citation:
The President of the United States of America takes pleasure in presenting the Navy Cross to Lieutenant Commander Oscar Charles Badger (NSN: 0-7626), United States Navy, for distinguished service in the line of his profession as Commanding Officer of the U.S.S. WORDEN, engaged in the important, exacting and hazardous duty of patrolling the waters infested by enemy submarines and mines, protecting vitally important convoys of troops and supplies through these waters and in offensive and defensive action, vigorously and unremittingly prosecuted against all forms of enemy naval activity during the World War.

See also

 List of Medal of Honor recipients (Veracruz)

Notes

References

External links
 

1890 births
1958 deaths
People from Washington, D.C.
United States Navy admirals
United States Naval Academy alumni
United States Navy personnel of World War I
United States Navy World War II admirals
Burials at Arlington National Cemetery
Recipients of the Navy Cross (United States)
United States Navy Medal of Honor recipients
Battle of Veracruz (1914) recipients of the Medal of Honor
American anti-communists